Paliampela is a village of the Elassona municipality. Before the 2011 local government reform it was a part of the independent community of Verdikousa. The 2011 census recorded 80 inhabitants in the village. Paliampela is a part of the community of Verdikousa.

Population
According to the 2011 census, the population of the settlement of Paliampela was 80 people, a decrease of almost 11% compared with the population at the previous census of 2001.

See also
 List of settlements in the Larissa regional unit

References

Populated places in Larissa (regional unit)